Dundlod  is a town in Nawalgarh tehsil Jhunjhunu district of Rajasthan in India. It is situated in the Shekhawati region of Rajasthan. Its old name was 'Shivgarh'. Best known for its fort and havelis. It is also known as 'Education town'. It is a beautiful village with its historical glory. Visitors come here to see its cultural beauty. It is located about seven kilometers north of Nawalgarh in the center of the Shekhawati region. Here celebrates all festivals. The most attractive fair are Gangor fair. Shyam baba fair, ShivRatri fair, Ganesh Chaturthi fair are other famous. 
It is the largest village around us. There are many showing sites.
Its an old & cultural village, known by its beauty.

Educational institutions

Shree Ramchandra Goyenka Senior Secondary School
Dundlod Public School
Dundlod Vidyapith School
Reads Public School
Shree Shyam Vidyaniketn Senior Secondary School
Balbharti Vidya Mandir Senior Secondary School
Sarswati Senior Secondary School
Government Girls School
Islamiya School
Government Sanskrit School
RPN School
Swadhaya 
Shekhawati Senior Secondary School
Shekhawati Girls College
Shekhawati College
Shekhawati Pharmacy College
Shekhawati Defense Acdmy
Ramchandra Goyenka Degree College
Tolasariya School
Tolasariya ITI College
New Indian Defense Academy
Teachers Training Institute
Gurucul Coaching Classes
Dundlod Connect
Hira Nath Baba Ashrm's Vedic Ashram

Geography
Dundlod has an average elevation of 354 metres (1164 feet).

See also
Shekhawati

References 

Cities and towns in Jhunjhunu district